James Birney (June 17, 1817 – May 8, 1888) was an American lawyer, newspaper publisher and politician from the U.S. state of Michigan. He served as the 13th lieutenant governor of Michigan and as the U.S. Minister to the Netherlands.

Early life
James Birney was born in Danville, Kentucky, the eldest son of Agatha (McDowell) and James Gillespie Birney, who was a presidential candidate for the Liberty Party in the 1840 and 1844 elections. Birney spent his early years in Alabama and Kentucky. Birney was educated at Centre College in Danville and in 1836 graduated from Miami University in Oxford, Ohio. For the next two years, Birney was employed by the university as a professor of the Greek and Latin languages. After this, he studied law at Yale College in New Haven, Connecticut.

Completing his studies, Birney moved to Cincinnati, Ohio and began the practice of law until 1856, when he succeeded to his father's business interests in the Saginaw Valley of Michigan, where his father had made large investments in what has become Bay City. Birney moved there in the summer of 1857. One of Birney's most notable early acts of public service was procuring the passage in 1857 of an act in the state legislature changing the name of "Lower Saginaw" to Bay City. In 1856, Birney had the distinction of editing the city's first newspaper, the Bay City Press, which lasted for only a few weeks.

Political career
In 1858, Birney was nominated as a Republican candidate for the Michigan Senate. At the time the senate district was regarded as a stronghold of the Democratic Party, thus it was seen as a significant achievement that Birney garnered all of the votes in the district within Bay County except for five. He served a single term in the Senate representing the Saginaw district. While in the Senate, Birney was chairman of the committee on public instruction and a member of the judiciary committee.

In 1860, Birney was nominated by the state Republican convention as the candidate for Lieutenant Governor with Austin Blair as candidate for Governor. Birney was elected to office by a majority of over 20,000 votes. While serving as Lieutenant Governor, a vacancy occurred in Michigan's 10th circuit court, and the governor offered the position to Birney. He resigned as Lieutenant Governor April 3, 1861 to accept the judicial appointment and served in that position for four years. Birney lost in the next judicial election and was succeeded by Jabez G. Sutherland.

After leaving the bench, Birney established the Bay City Chronicle in 1871 as a weekly Republican paper and in June 1873 began publishing the Morning Chronicle. Birney was also a delegate to Republican National Convention from Michigan in 1872.

In 1872, Governor Henry P. Baldwin nominated Birney to U.S. President Ulysses S. Grant as Centennial Commissioner for Michigan to celebrate the Hundredth Anniversary of the Declaration of Independence in 1876. Birney was unable to serve in this capacity, however, as he was appointed on December 17, 1875 as U.S. Minister to the Netherlands. Birney departed for The Hague in 1876 and served until 1882.

Birney died on May 8, 1888 in Bay City, Michigan. He is interred in Pine Ridge Cemetery in Bay City.

Personal life
While in New Haven studying at Yale College, Birney married Amanda Moulton on June 1, 1841. His wife was the stepdaughter of Nathaniel Bacon, Esquire of New Haven. Birney and his wife had five children: James G. Birney, Arthur Moulton Birney, Sophia Hull Birney, Alice Birney and one child that died in infancy. The eldest, James G. Birney, distinguished himself as Captain in the 7th Regiment of Michigan Volunteers and died while an officer of the U.S. regular army.

References

Further reading
 
 

1817 births
1888 deaths
Lieutenant Governors of Michigan
Miami University alumni
Yale College alumni
Republican Party Michigan state senators
Ambassadors of the United States to the Netherlands
Centre College alumni
Politicians from Danville, Kentucky
Burials in Michigan
19th-century American diplomats
Politicians from Bay City, Michigan
Michigan lawyers
19th-century American politicians
19th-century American lawyers